Koorete (also Amaarro, Amarro, Badittu, Koore, Koyra, Kwera, Nuna) is the language spoken by the Koore people of southern Ethiopia.

Notes

Bibliography
Hayward, Richard. 1982. Notes on the Koyra Language. Afrika und Übersee 65: pp. 211–268.
Mendisu, Binyam Sisay. 2010. Aspects of Koorete Verb Morphology. Köppe: Cologne.
Theil, Rolf. 2011. Koorete segmental phonology. Journal of African Languages and Linguistics 32: pp. 275–306.
Theil. Rolf. 2013. Koorete tonology. Pp. 167–174 in: Proceedings of the 5th International Conference on Cushitic and Omotic Languages, Paris, 16–18 April 2008. Rüdiger Köppe Verlag.

External links
 World Atlas of Language Structures information on Koorete
 Website maintained by the language community, includes published literature in the Koore language

Languages of Ethiopia
North Omotic languages